Troy Roberts (born September 18, 1983 in San Jose, California) is a former American soccer player.

Career

College and Amateur
Roberts attended Washington High School in Fremont, California, and played college soccer at UC Berkeley, and was named All-Pac-10 his junior and senior seasons. He also played in the National Premier Soccer League with Sonoma County Sol in its inaugural season in 2004.

Professional
Roberts was drafted in the first round (8th overall) in the 2005 MLS SuperDraft by Los Angeles Galaxy, and although he saw limited action with the team in his rookie season, went on to play 61 games in his four years with the club, winning both the MLS Cup and the US Open Cup in 2005.

Roberts was waived by Galaxy in February 2009, and joined the Cleveland City Stars of the USL First Division in April 2009.

In March 2010, Roberts signed with the Rochester Rhinos of the USSF 2nd Division. He re-signed for 2012, his third season with Rochester, on October 25, 2011.

Personal
Roberts graduated with a bachelor's degree in Social Welfare at UC Berkeley.  He is the older brother of fellow former professional soccer player Jamil Roberts. In 2014, Roberts decided to retire from soccer and sell insurance for a living with former Rochester Rhinos players Alfonso Motagalvan and Nano Short.

Honors

Los Angeles Galaxy
Major League Soccer MLS Cup (1): 2005

Rochester Rhinos
USSF D-2 Pro League Regular Season Champions (1): 2010

Individual
USSF D-2 Pro League Best XI (1): 2010

References

External links
 Cleveland City Stars bio
 MLS player profile
 Cal Bears bio

1983 births
Living people
American soccer players
California Golden Bears men's soccer players
Cleveland City Stars players
LA Galaxy players
Major League Soccer players
Rochester New York FC players
Sonoma County Sol players
Sportspeople from the San Francisco Bay Area
LA Galaxy draft picks
USL First Division players
USSF Division 2 Professional League players
USL Championship players
Association football defenders
Soccer players from California